Jin Suo Chi (pronounced ) is a very rare Wuyi Oolong with a light taste.

References
 Babelcarp on Jin Suo Chi

Oolong tea
Chinese teas
Chinese tea grown in Fujian
Wuyi tea